Highburton Industrial and Provident Society Limited, or Highburton Co-op, was a small consumer co-operative based in the West Yorkshire village of Highburton, five miles southeast of Huddersfield. The Society was founded in 1857, buying the building from the church, and operating a single store on Towngate in the village.  The Society claimed to being the world's oldest operating independent single retail co-operative outlet. In 2006, the Society held talks with the nearby Wooldale Co-op with a view to merging the two Societies' operations but these talks ended without a merger going ahead.

Highburton Co-operative closed for business on 27 February 2009.

The Highburton Industrial and Provident Society (Highburton Co-op) voted to go into liquidation on 23 March 2010.

The former Highburton Industrial and Provident Society (Highburton Co-op) building was acquired on 17 May 2010 by Property Compliance Solutions Limited. From 2010, and following building refurbishment, the property was divided into two leased units, the ground floor being a convenience new shop run by Mr Peter Clegg, and the first floor being occupied by PCS Asbestos Consultants Limited.

References

Consumers' co-operatives of the United Kingdom
Retail companies established in 1857
Retail companies disestablished in 2009
Former co-operatives of the United Kingdom
Kirkburton